The C soprano saxophone is a member of the saxophone family, invented in 1846.  It closely resembles the more common B soprano saxophone but is pitched a whole step higher.  Unlike most other saxophones, it is not a transposing instrument, a quality it shares with the C melody (also called C tenor) saxophone. The C soprano has a very similar range to the oboe.

As with C melody saxophones, American production of C sopranos commenced circa 1919 and ended around 1929. The same companies that made C melody instruments manufactured C soprano saxophones, and they were marketed to those who wished to perform oboe parts in military bands, vaudeville arrangements, or church hymnals. C sopranos made by some French manufacturers exist but are exceedingly rare.

In the early 2010s, the New Zealand-based company Aquilasax contracted a factory in China to produce C sopranos, with modern keywork but a bore copied from C.G. Conn's 1920s model. These received a very mildly positive response from players and technicians who encountered them, but demand was low and only a small number was produced. Aquilasax is now defunct, and the factory that produced these instruments is no longer operational.

C sopranos are the same shape as B sopranos and differ in length by only around 3 centimeters. Nearly all vintage examples are keyed from low Bb to high Eb. Aquilasax's 2010s models were keyed to high F and F#. C soprano saxophones usually have a "C" stamped on them, close to the serial number.

In classical music 
The C soprano saxophone was written for by Richard Strauss in his Sinfonia Domestica, where included in the music are parts for four saxophones including a soprano saxophone in C.

Notes 

Saxophones
C instruments